D. H. Hopson (born 1859) was a teacher, state legislator, tax assessor, and coroner in Mississippi. He represented Coahoma County in the Mississippi House of Representatives in 1888 as a Democrat.

He was born in 1859 in Coahoma County, Mississippi.

He served as tax assessor in 1884 and as coroner in 1896.

He served with fellow Coahoma representative W. H. Stovall.

References

1859 births
Year of death missing
Date of death unknown
Members of the Mississippi House of Representatives